Grad "Gerrie" Damen (born 26 June 1956) is a Dutch former professional footballer who played in the Eredivisie for NAC Breda as a midfielder. His grandson also called Grad is also a footballer, and another grandson also called Grad is a singer.

References

1956 births
Living people
Dutch footballers
NAC Breda players
Eredivisie players
Association football midfielders